Brodtkorb is a Norwegian family.

It has its alleged origin in Saxony, Germany. The family first came to Norway in 1643 with Tobias Brodtkorb († 1676), who was a coin-writer (Norwegian: myntskriver) in Akershus and later a customs and export officer in Fredrikstad. His son was Christian Brodtkorb (1653–1701), goldsmith in Oslo, and his grandson was Tobias Brodtkorb (1685–1763), whose three sons established the family's principal branches:

 Eilert Christian Brodtkorb (1721–1806), weigher and measurer in Kristiansund.
 Christian Johannes Brodtkorb (1725–97), captain and owner of Kirkesæter Farm (Kirkesæter gård) in Hemne.
 Niels Gierbrandt Brodtkorb (1729–96), council of justice and owner of Tjøtta Farm (Tjøttagodset) and estate in Alstahaug.

Brodtkorb of Tjøtta
Estate owners
The family's most prominent branch was the Brodtkorbs of Tjøttagodset. In 1767,   Niels Gierbrandt Brodtkorb purchased the large estate on the island  of Tjøtta in Alstahaug. He married Anna Catharina Hvid, who was the daughter of Johan Christian Hvid, owner of the Tromsø estate (Tromsøgodset), and granddaughter of Michael Hvid, who had been the manager of the same estate, originally a part of the Baron of Westervick's estate in Northern Norway.

Their son Johan Christian Hvid Brodtkorb (1766–1845) took over the Tjøtta estate.  Through his marriage to Maren Winther, who was the daughter of estate owner Niels Winther and Anne Bech at Vevelstad, Brodtkorb extended the property with more land. Thereafter followed their son, Niels Gerbrand Winther Brodtkorb (1792–1865) married to Marie Berg, who was the daughter of Johan Ernst Berg, County Governor of Nordland. Their son was Johan Christian Brodtkorb, who became the last estate owner at Tjøtta.

Bankruptcy
When the last proprietarian, Johan Brodtkorb the younger, died on 3 July 1918, the estate was bankrupt. One sought to let Brodtkorb relatives buy the estate, and in accordance with a property deed of 1867, they had pre-emption to Tjøtta Farm. This attempt did not succeed. The final auction was held in 1929, when the government, represented by the Ministry of Agriculture, bought the farm for 83,000 crowns (90,000 crowns including various fees).

The manor's interior, however, had been sold one year earlier in an auction lasting for seven days. The manor was then basically emptied for old and valuable objects, thereafter transported to other parts of the country. Among the most precious items were a cabinet from 1627 belonging to Overlord of Helgeland Peter Jacobsen Falch and Anna Jonsdotter of Tjøtta Farm (Tjøtta gard), a collection of over 700 books, whereof many were old and written by hand, and a heraldic artwork displaying the Brodtkorb coat of arms. Also silver, china, and renaissance furniture were sold for relatively low prices.

Genealogy
The family lineage dating back to 1643, the year in which Tobias Brodtkorb came to Norway, is documented in a work of 1904 by Antoinette Augusta Gram, née Brodtkorb. Prior to 1643, the family name appears among matriculated students at the University of Leipzig. There is also a digital version of the lineage.

Brodtkorb of Tjøtta
 Niels Gierbrandt Brodtkorb (1729–96), ∞ Anna Catharina Hvid
 Johan Christian Hvid Brodtkorb (1766–1845), ∞ Maren Greger Winther
 Niels Gierbrandt Winther Brodtkorb (1792–1865), ∞ Marie Berg
 Johan Christian Brodtkorb

Family name
The German noun Brotkorb, which until the 1800s was spelled Brodtkorb, means 'breadbasket'.

Family coat of arms
Various arms have been used by family members. The use of the family's present coat of arms may be traced back to the 1700s.

Description: A golden basket under three golden stars. Upon the helm seven green peacock feathers.

Selection of prominent family members
 Birger Brodtkorb (1891–1935), of the Tjøtta branch, athlete
 Eilif Brodtkorb (b. 1936), rower
 Kari Nissen Brodtkorb (b. 1942), architect 
 Reidar Brodtkorb (1909–81), author
 Thor Brodtkorb (1907–83), ambassador to Austria

Literature and sources
 Hans Cappelen, Norske slektsvåpen (Norwegian Family Coats of Arms), Oslo 1969 (2nd ed. 1976), p.72
 Store norske leksikon: Brodtkorb
 Wikipedia, Norwegian Bokmål & Riksmål: Brodtkorb
 Wikipedia, Norwegian Bokmål & Riksmål: Tjøttagodset

References

Norwegian families
Norwegian noble families
Families of German ancestry